Salisbury Township School District is a small, suburban, public school district located in Lehigh County, Pennsylvania in the Lehigh Valley region of eastern Pennsylvania. It serves Salisbury Township.

As of the 2021–22 school year, the school district had a total enrollment of 1,485 students between all its four schools, according to National Center for Education Statistics data, which include Salisbury High School for grades nine through 12, Salisbury Middle School for grades five through eight, Arts Academy Charter School for grades five through eight, and Salisbury Elementary School for kindergarten through fourth grade.

According to 2000 census data, the school district serves a resident population of 13,498. By 2010, The U.S. Census Bureau reported that Salisbury Township School District's resident population was 13,505 people. In 2009, the district residents’ per capita income was $28,073, while the median family income was $62,534. In the Commonwealth, the median family income was $49,501 and the United States median family income was $49,445, in 2010.  By 2013, the median household income in the United States rose to $52,100. The educational attainment levels for the Salisbury Township School District population (25 years old and over) were 91.0% high school graduates and 28.9% college graduates.

Salisbury High School students may choose to attend Lehigh Career and Technical Institute for training in the trades. The Carbon-Lehigh Intermediate Unit IU21 provides the district with a wide variety of services like specialized education for disabled students and hearing, speech and visual disability services and professional development for staff and faculty.

Schools
Salisbury High School
Salisbury Middle School
Salisbury Elementary School
Arts Academy Charter School (grades 5-8)

Extracurriculars

High school sports
The school district's sports include:

Varsity

Boys
Baseball - AA
Basketball- AAA
Cross Country - AA
Football - AA
Golf - AA
Rifle - AAAA
Soccer - AA
Swimming and diving - AA
Tennis - AA
Track and field - AA
Wrestling	- AA

Girls
Basketball - AA
Cheer - AAAA
Cross Country - AA
Field hockey - AA
Golf - AA
Rifle - AAAA
Soccer (Fall) - AA
Softball - AA
Swimming and diving - AA
Girls' tennis - AA
Track and field - AA

Middle School sports

Boys
Baseball
Basketball
Cross Country
Football
Soccer
Swimming and Diving
Track and Field
Wrestling	

Girls
Basketball
Cross Country
Field Hockey
Indoor Track and Field
Soccer (Fall)
Softball
Swimming and Diving
Track and Field

According to PIAA directory July 2013

References

External links

Salisbury Township School District on Facebook
Salisbury Township School District on Twitter

School districts in Lehigh County, Pennsylvania